Trichoboscis is a genus of moth in the family Lecithoceridae.

Species
 Trichoboscis crocosema (Meyrick, 1929)
 Trichoboscis pansarista Meyrick, 1929

References

Natural History Museum Lepidoptera genus database

Lecithocerinae
Moth genera